John Arthur Taylor, Jr. (February 4, 1916 – June 15, 1987), nicknamed "Schoolboy", was an American Negro league pitcher in the 1930s and 1940s.

A native of Hartford, Connecticut, Taylor starred in baseball and track at Bulkeley High School. He joined the New York Cubans in 1935, and tossed a no-hitter against Satchel Paige's All-Stars at the Polo Grounds in 1937. In 1938, Taylor was selected to play in the East–West All-Star Game, and hurled two scoreless innings of relief. Taylor played briefly for the Newark Eagles in 1940.  He served in the US Army from 1942 to 1944, then returned to play for the New York Cubans for two more seasons.

Taylor died in Hartford in 1987 at age 71.

References

External links
 and Seamheads
 Johnny Taylor biography from Society for American Baseball Research (SABR)

1916 births
1987 deaths
Newark Eagles players
New York Cubans players
Pittsburgh Crawfords players
Toledo Crawfords players
20th-century African-American sportspeople
Baseball pitchers